Hyatt Regency Seattle, also known as 808 Howell Street and 8th & Howell, is a high-rise hotel in the Denny Triangle neighborhood of Seattle, Washington, United States that opened in December 2018. The 45-story hotel, operated by Hyatt, has 1,260 hotel rooms and is the largest in the city. It also has  of meeting and event space, as well as two ballrooms and a lounge.

History

The original proposal for the site was revealed in 2008, but later cancelled due to the Great Recession. That plan called for a 51-story,  hotel that was to be constructed from 2011 to 2013. The hotel would have included  of convention space, meeting rooms, two ballrooms, a restaurant, parking for 1,100 cars, and 1,200 rooms. The site, a three-quarter-block, L-shaped parcel that Richard Hedreen bought in 1995 for $4.5 million, included a Greyhound Lines bus station that would have been demolished for the hotel.

After cancelling the earlier hotel project, R.C. Hedreen purchased the remaining land on the block in 2012. The developer has discussed putting a hotel and possibly an office building on the site. The developer then had a plan to build two  towers with a hotel, apartments, and office space. The plan was altered in March 2013, most notably to remove the offices and second tower, to simplify the approval process.

This project was further modified because an arrangement could not be reached with the City of Seattle to vacate the alley in exchange for the inclusion of 152 affordable housing units, using only three quarters of the block. The remaining quarter will be developed into a smaller, 450-room hotel. The project was at the center of a dispute between developer Hedreen and a local labor union, who alleged that the building would not provide adequate public benefits as required by the city's land use code; ultimately, an appeal to the city was rejected and allowed construction of the project to begin in 2015.

Greyhound relocated the bus terminal in 2014 to a location near the Stadium light rail station in the SoDo neighborhood. Demolition of the terminal building began in September 2015. The 45-story hotel opened on December 10, 2018, and is operated under the Hyatt Regency brand. It cost $470 million to construct and fully opened on December 17, 2018. The hotel has conferences booked into 2026, including a meeting of the American Library Association in January 2019 that was the venue's first major event.

Facilities

The 45-story hotel has 1,264 rooms, making it the largest hotel in the Pacific Northwest. It has  of conference and meeting space, including 46 meeting rooms and two ballrooms. The lower floors of the building has two restaurants and a "grab and go" store. The Hyatt Regency has a staff of more than 400 workers.

See also
List of tallest buildings in Seattle

References

Skyscraper hotels in Seattle
Hotel buildings completed in 2018
Hyatt Hotels and Resorts
2018 establishments in Washington (state)